Handheld Culture, Ltd. (“Handheld”,  首尚文化有限公司) is a Chinese online bookstore. It uses cloud technology, mobile app development and web integration. Called by The Wall Street Journal Asia as "the world's Chinese e-bookstore", Handheld is one of the largest online e-bookstores in Hong Kong.

References

External links 
 

Online retailers of China